Helsingør station is the principal railway station serving the city of Helsingør, Denmark. It is the terminus of the Coast Line to Copenhagen, the Little North Line to Hillerød and the Hornbæk Line to Gilleleje. It also provides easy access to the ferries to Helsingborg, Sweden.

History

The first railway station in Helsingør was built in 1863 as the terminus of the North Line from Copenhagen to Helsingør by way of Hillerød in 1863.

In 1891, the station was moved to its current location close to the harbour in order to provide easier access to the ferries to Helsingborg in Sweden. The current station was inaugurated on 24 October 1891.

In 1897, Helsingør station also became the terminus of the new Coast Line, a more direct railway line between Copenhagen and Helsingør along the coast of the Øresund. From 1908, all trains on the Hornbæk Line (opened in 1906) were continued from Grønnehave station in the northern part of the city to Helsingør station, arriving and departing from a special railway halt in the street next to the station building.

Architecture

Formerly located on a sea bed, this station building rests on 1,600 poles embedded into the ground. It was designed by architect Niels Peder Christian Holsøe in collaboration with Heinrich Wenck in a Neo-Renaissance style locally known as Rosenborg Style after Rosenborg Castle in Copenhagen. It imitates Christian IV's Dutch Renaissance-style buildings from the first half of the 17th century and is characterized by red brickwork combined with sandstone ornamentation Dutch gables and an abundance of turrets with copper-clad spires.

The main entrance is flanked by marble columns. The room facing the sea, which now houses a restaurant, originally served as private chambers for the royal family.

In 1984, DSB embarked on a comprehensive restoration of the station building. It included new tiles in the original patterns on floors and exposure and restoration of the original decorations on walls and ceilings. The work was completed in 1987, and the main building including the platform roofs was listed in 1990.

Station facilities 
Inside the station building there is a combined ticket office and convenience store operated by 7-Eleven, automated ticket machines, toilets and lockers.

Adjacent to the station are the Helsingør ferry terminal and the Helsingør bus terminal.

See also
 List of railway stations in Denmark

References

External links

DSB Øresunds website 
Lokaltog

Railway stations in the Capital Region of Denmark
Listed railway stations in Denmark
Listed buildings and structures in Helsingør Municipality
Historicist architecture in Denmark
Renaissance Revival architecture in Denmark
Railway stations opened in 1891
Heinrich Wenck buildings
Railway stations in the Øresund Region
Helsingør
Railway stations in Denmark opened in the 19th century